Syanno or Senno is a city in Vitebsk Region, Belarus. As of the 2018, the population was 7,092.

History 
The village is first mentioned in a document of 1442. Fairs were held there, and a lively hay market gave it its name ( seno 'hay'). From the first half of the 17th century it belonged to the Sapieha family; from the second half of the 18th century, to the Ogińskis. In 1772 it became part of the Russian Empire.

In 1924, Senno became part of the Byelorussian Soviet Socialist Republic. During World War II, it was the site of a major tank battle in July 1941.

References

External links
 The murder of the Jews of Syanno during World War II, at Yad Vashem website
 

Cities in Belarus
Populated places in Vitebsk Region
Vitebsk Voivodeship
Sennensky Uyezd
Holocaust locations in Belarus